Nassarius arcadioi is a species of sea snail, a marine gastropod mollusk in the family Nassariidae, the Nassa mud snails or dog whelks.

Description
The shell grows to a length of 25 mm.

Distribution
This species occurs in the Atlantic Ocean off Mauritania at depths between 200 m and 300 m.

References

 Rolán E. & Hernández J.M. (2005) The West African species of the group Nassarius denticulatus (Mollusca, Neogastropoda), with the description of a new species. Journal of Conchology 38(5): 499–511. page(s): 507

External links
 

Nassariidae
Gastropods described in 2005